Baikal (Russian: Байкал) is a Soviet (now Russian), non-alcoholic beverage of dark-brown colour. The beverage's basis is water, but it also contains extracts of natural herbs, sugar, citric acid, and carbon dioxide. The natural herbs and extracts utilized typically include black tea extract, Siberian ginseng, cardamom oil, eucalyptus oil, lemon oil, liquorice, St. John's wort and laurel.

History 
Baikal's production started in 1969. It was developed as a Soviet alternative to Coca-Cola.

The drink was developed with the Moscow 1980 Summer Olympics in mind, as Western soda companies did not operate in the USSR at that time.  It successfully reached its goal of becoming the official drink of those Summer Olympics.  The drink was named after Lake Baikal, as a symbol of purity and unique nature.  Baikal's formula was redesigned after Pepsi Cola entered production in the USSR in 1973.

In Moscow in the 1990s, it was nearly impossible to find Baikal; nevertheless, in Saint Petersburg, the beverage's production was continued by the "Polustrovo" factory.

Baikal today 
The rights to the Baikal formula are owned by Russian government's , which licenses the production of Baikal. Currently, the formula is licensed to Pepsi, Dohler and Ost-Aqua, amongst other smaller companies. The institute is developing new formulas for low calorie and diabetic friendly Baikal soft drinks.

There are several generic carbonated soft drinks sold under the name Baikal both inside of Russia and abroad, made by various companies – for instance, SLCO GmbH (Siberia Group) in Germany.  One such soft drink brand inspired by the original Baikal drink is WOSTOK (meaning 'East' in Russian), having been invented in 2009 by a Dutch photographer who had spent nearly two decades in Moscow. Wostok's Tannenwald flavour claims to be based on the original 1973 recipe.

Rospatent recognized the combined designation Baikal as of 1 May 2019 as a well-known trademark in the Russian Federation, in respect of goods of class 32 of the Nice Classification "non-alcoholic carbonated drinks", in the name of Baikal LLC, Irkutsk.

Aqualife 

At present, industrial bottling of non-alcoholic carbonated drinks marked with a combined designation, including the word element "BAIKAL", is carried out on the basis of a license agreement at the LLC "PK" AQUALIFE " enterprise.

OOO PK Aqualife currently manufactures several versions of Baikal soft drink, both in several brands of renewed recipes, and also the original formula of 1977. The original recipe of the soda is sold under the "Baikal 1977" trademark, whereas the new recipe is sold as simply "Baikal". The company also manufactures multiple new versions, which are based on the original 1977 recipe, such as vanilla and low calorie.

In 2021, Coca-Cola sued Aqualife for Fantola, a Fanta competitor, according to the Russian newspaper Kommersant.

Germany 
The WOSTOK line of products are produced and available in Germany by WOSTOK - Baikal Getränke GmbH.

Ukraine 
Several manufacturers produce Baikal in Ukraine under the trademark «Байкал».

Kazakhstan 
TOO «ДальПродукт» manufactures Baikal in Almaty, Kazakhstan.

Ingredients 
A 1 liter glass bottle of Chernogolovka Baikal contains: Artesian water, sugar, extracts (eleutherococcus, black tea), caramel color (E150), natural flavors, acidity regulator citric acid, oils (cardamom, eucalyptus, lemon), preservative sodium benzoate.

References

External links

 Технологическая инструкция по производству концентрата для напитка «Байкал» ТИ 18-6-26-85. Упрпиво Минпищепрома СССР. 1985 г.
 Официальный сайт ГУ ВНИИ ПБ и ВП
 Baikal Getränke GmbH official website

Cola
Products introduced in 1969
Soviet brands
Food and drink in the Soviet Union